Scott Harvey (born May 30, 1978) is an American amateur golfer. In 2014, he won the U.S. Mid-Amateur, defeating Brad Nurski, 6 and 5, in the 36-hole championship match. Harvey won the 2015 South American Amateur in Peru, finishing with a two shot margin of victory. His win in the U.S. Mid-Amateur resulted in an invitation to the 2015 Masters Tournament, his first major championship, where he was cut after the second round after shooting 76-81, with a total score of +13.

Tournament wins
2011 Carolinas Amateur, North Carolina Open
2012 Carolinas Mid-Amateur, North Carolina Mid-Amateur
2013 Carolinas Mid-Amateur
2014 Cardinal Amateur, U.S. Mid-Amateur
2015 South American Amateur, Gasparilla Invitational
2016 Carolinas Mid Amateur, George C Thomas Invitational
2017 Pine Needles Invitational w/ Brian Westveer, George L Coleman Invitational, George C Thomas Invitational, North Carolina Mid-Amateur
2018 George C Thomas Invitational
2019 George L Coleman Invitational, George C Thomas Invitational - Mid-Amateur, U.S. Amateur Four-Ball (with Todd Mitchell)
2021 Carolinas Amateur Championship

Source:

Results in major championships

CUT = missed the half-way cut

U.S. national team appearances
Amateur
Walker Cup: 2015

References 

American male golfers
Amateur golfers
West Florida Argonauts men's golfers
High Point Panthers athletes
Sportspeople from Greensboro, North Carolina
1978 births
Living people